Bel-Air is a neighborhood of Sanford, Florida.

References

Unincorporated communities in Seminole County, Florida
Neighborhoods in Florida
Unincorporated communities in Florida